Bangalore Rugby Football Club (B.R.F.C) is a rugby union club based in Bangalore. They currently participate in the All India & South Asia Rugby Tournament & the National Rugby Championship - Div 1.

History
B.R.F.C was founded in 1996, by some ex-pats living in the city then. Today it is a club consisting mainly of Indians. They also have an expatriate team associated to them called the "Bangalore Refugees" and started a girls team in 2009, they also have boys u-19 and u-16 teams.

B.R.F.C has provided several players to the India national team over the years, Internationals include: Subramani P.E, Vinay Rai, Puneeth Krishnamurthy, Tarun Appanna, Thaman Thimaiah, Roshan Lobo. And Salik Zaffar, Deepam Kohli and Nishant Nerayath at the U-19 level.

B.R.F.C has participated in various national level tournaments over the years, but their best year has been 2005 when they reached the finals of the All India & South Asia Rugby Tournament and lost the finals to British Asian Rugby Association. Thus making them the number 1 team in the country for that year.

Squad
2022-23 National Rugby Championship - Division 1

References

Rugby union in India
Indian rugby union teams